Boiu Mare is a commune in Maramureș County, Transylvania, Romania. It is composed of four villages: Boiu Mare, Frâncenii Boiului (Frinkfalva), Prislop (Jóháza) and Românești (Szalmapatak).

References

Communes in Maramureș County
Localities in Transylvania